Romolo Valli (7 February 1925 – 1 February 1980) was an Italian actor.

Valli was born in Reggio Emilia. He was one of the best known Italian actors from the 1950s to his death. He worked for both the stage and the silver screen. Among the directors he collaborated with were Vittorio De Sica, Sergio Leone, Roman Polanski, Roger Vadim, and Luchino Visconti, who cast Valli in three feature films (Il Gattopardo, Morte a Venezia, Gruppo di famiglia in un interno) and the episode Il lavoro of Boccaccio '70. Valli died in a car accident, less than one week before his 55th birthday.

Theatre
 Così è (se vi pare) (1974)

Filmography

Policarpo ufficiale di scrittura (1959) - Commendator Egidio Marzi Laurenzi
The Great War (1959) - Tenente Gallina
Jovanka e le altre (1960) - Mirko
Call Girls of Rome (1960) - Il commissario
Il carro armato dell'8 settembre (1960)
La ragazza con la valigia (1961) - Don Pietro Introna
La viaccia (1961) - Dante
Un giorno da leoni (1961) - Edoardo
Boccaccio '70 (1962) - Lawyer Zacchi (segment "Il lavoro")
Senilità (1962) - Emilio Brentani (voice, uncredited)
Peccati d'estate (1962) - Carlino
Una storia milanese (1962) - Mr. Gessner
The Shortest Day (1962) - Il capitano
Il Gattopardo (1963) - Father Pirrone
Sweet and Sour (1963) - Signor X
I fuorilegge del matrimonio (1963) - Francesco
La vendetta della signora (1964) - Town Painter
La costanza della ragione (1964) - (uncredited)
E venne un uomo (1965) - The Intermediary (voice)
I complessi (1965) - Father Baldini (segment "Guglielmo il Dentone")
La Mandragola (1965) - Messer Nicia
Non stuzzicate la zanzara (1967) - Bartolomeo Santangelo padre di Rita
Il marito è mio e l'ammazzo quando mi pare (1968) - Butler
Boom! (1968) - Dr. Luilo
Barbarella (1968)
Scacco alla regina (1969) - Enrico Valdman
Il giardino dei Finzi Contini (1970) - Giorgio's Father
Morte a Venezia (1971) - Hotel Manager
Er Più – storia d'amore e di coltello (1971) - Il maresciallo
Giù la testa (1971) - Dr. Villega
Paulina 1880 (1972) - Farinata
What? (1972) - Giovanni
Silence the Witness (1974) - Il ministro
Gruppo di famiglia in un interno (1974) - Micheli
Nipoti miei diletti (1974) - Trèves
Novecento (1976) - Giovanni Berlinghieri
Un borghese piccolo piccolo (1977) - Dr. Spazioni
Un attimo, una vita (1977) - Uncle Luigi
The Devil's Advocate (1977) - Cardinal Marotta
Holocaust 2000 (1977) - Charrier
Chiaro di donna (1979) - Galba (final film role)

References

 Filmography: https://www.imdb.com/name/nm0885123/?mode=desktop&ref_=m_ft_dsk#filmography* on February 16, 2015

External links

1925 births
1980 deaths
People from Reggio Emilia
Italian male film actors
Road incident deaths in Italy
Nastro d'Argento winners
20th-century Italian male actors
Italian male television actors